Darek Oleszkiewicz (born February 20, 1963), also known as Darek Oles, is a jazz bassist, composer, arranger, and educator.

Biography
Oleszkiewicz was born in Wrocław, Poland, on February 20, 1963. He lived in Kraków in the early 1980s, then moved to Los Angeles in 1987 or 1988 and attended California Institute of the Arts from 1989 on a full scholarship. While studying at Cal Arts he was a  protégé of Charlie Haden. In the early 1990s and 2000s he built a reputation on the West Coast of the United States. He co-founded the Los Angeles Jazz Quartet in 1993, with saxophonist Chuck Manning, guitarist Larry Koonse, and drummer Kevin Tullius. They recorded for Naxos Records and Not Two Records.

Oleszkiewicz's first album as sole leader was Like a Dream, which consisted largely of his own compositions. It included quartet and trio tracks, and duets with pianist Brad Mehldau. He had earlier played on Mehldau's Largo. Oleszkiewicz was featured prominently with Koonse on the 2006 album Storybook.

In 2010 Oleszkiewicz was a co-leader with Peter Erskine, Bob Mintzer, and Alan Pasqua on the album Standards 2: Movie Music. Oleszkiewicz was co-leader with Adam Czerwniński for the album Raindance.

Oleszkiewicz is a faculty member at California Institute of the Arts, and the University of Southern California, He continues to record, including on trombonist Bob McChesney's Chez Sez in 2015, and with other USC faculty members, including on Kait Dunton's Mountain Suite in the same year.

Playing style
On his debut as leader, Oleszkiewicz's style was described as containing "the inevitable lineage to Scott LaFaro and Bill Evans, [...and] combines a certain economy of style that is reminiscent of Charlie Haden". The woodiness of his tone was also compared with Haden's, with the addition of "a certain Gary Peacock-like edge to it".

Discography

As a leader or co-leader
The Promise , a solo bass tribute to John Coltrane
Blues for Charlie, a solo bass tribute to Charlie Haden
Expectation, with Los Angeles Jazz Ensemble (Kind of Blue)
Like a Dream (Cryptogramophone) featuring Brad Mehldau
Raindance (ACR 2006), co-led with Adam Czerwniński
Pictures (ACR 2009), co-led with Adam Czerwniński
Storybook (Jazz Compass), co-led with Larry Koonse
Standards 2: Movie Music (Fuzzy Music), co-led with Peter Erskine, Bob Mintzer and Alan Pasqua
Live At Jazz Nad Odrą (L.A. Jazz Quartet Music), with Los Angeles Jazz Quartet
Conversation Piece (Naxos Jazz), with Los Angeles Jazz Quartet
Look to the East (Naxos Jazz), with Los Angeles Jazz Quartet
Family Song (Not Two), with Los Angeles Jazz Quartet
Astarte (GOWI), with Los Angeles Jazz Quartet
Traveling Birds Quintet (Polonia), with Traveling Birds Quintet
Return to the Nest (Polonia), with Traveling Birds Quintet

As sideman
With Peter Erskine, George Garzone and Alan Pasqua
Three Nights In L.A. (2019)
With Kei Akagi
Aqua Puzzle (2018)
With Bill Cunliffe
Live at Bernies (2001)
With Kait Dunton
Mountain Suite (2012)
With Yelena Eckemoff
Flying Steps (2010)
With Peter Erskine
The Interlochen Concert (2009)
With Terry Gibbs
Wham (1999)
With Anna Maria Jopek
Upojenie (2003)
Barefoot (2002)
Bosa (2000)
With Larry Koonse
Storybook (2006)
With Charles Lloyd
The Water Is Wide (1999)
With Bennie Maupin
Penumbra (2003)
With Bob McChesney
Chez Sez (2015)
With Brad Mehldau
Largo (2002)
With Josh Nelson
Let It Go (2007)
With Sara Niemietz
Fountain & Vine (2015)
With Jack Nimitz
Live at Capozzoli's (1997)
With Alan Pasqua
My New Old Friend (2005)
Northern Lights (2018) 
With Bobby Shew
Play the Music of Reed Kotler (2001)
With David Sills
Big (2002)
With Kuba Stankiewicz and Peter Erskine
Music Of Henryk Wars (2017)
Music Of Bronislaw Kaper (2016)
Music Of Victor Young (2015)
With Gavin Templeton
Asterperious Special (2012)
With Ben Wendel
Simple Song (2009)
With Mike Wofford
Time Cafe (2001)
With Aga Zaryan
Remembering Nina And Abbey (2013)
A Book of Luminous Things (2011)
Live At Palladium (2008)
Picking Up The Pieces (2006)
My Lullaby (2002)

Main source:

References

Bibliography

 

1963 births
Jazz double-bassists
Living people
University of Southern California faculty
21st-century double-bassists